Barbara Gladstone ( Levitt) is an American art dealer and film producer. She is owner of Gladstone Gallery, a contemporary art gallery with locations in New York and Brussels.

Gladstone Gallery

History
In 1980, Gladstone gave up teaching art history at Hofstra University to open an art gallery in Manhattan, where she began showing Jenny Holzer.

From 1989 to 1992, Gladstone Gallery collaborated with Christian Stein, an Italian art gallerist, on SteinGladstone. Located in a renovated firehouse at 99 Wooster Street in Soho, the gallery concentrated exclusively on rarely seen installation works by both Italian and American artists.

Gladstone Gallery staged Matthew Barney's first New York solo show in 1991 and has since introduce many international artists to an American audience. Before moving to Chelsea in 1996, the gallery was located in Soho and on 57th Street in New York City. In 1996, the gallery teamed up with two other galleries – Metro Pictures and Matthew Marks Gallery – to acquire and divide up a  warehouse at 515 West 24th Street. In addition, Gladstone Gallery operates spaces at 530 West 21st Street and at 12 Rue du Grand Cerf in Brussels.

The gallery is also a prominent participant in many major art fairs.

In 2002, Gladstone brought Curt Marcus on as partner for several years. In 2020, Gladstone Gallery merged with Gavin Brown's Enterprise and made Gavin Brown a partner.

Since 2018, Gladstone has been serving on the board of the non-profit Artists Space.

Artists
Gladstone Gallery today represents many contemporary artists, including:
 Ed Atkins (since 2020)
 Matthew Barney (since 1991)
 Thomas Bayrle (since 2020)
 Kerstin Brätsch (since 2020) 
 Carroll Dunham 
 Ian Cheng (since 2017)
 LaToya Ruby Frazier (since 2020) 
 Cyprien Gaillard (since 2013)
 Arthur Jafa (since 2020)
 Joan Jonas (since 2020)
 Anish Kapoor
 Alex Katz (since 2020)
 Mark Leckey (since 2020)
 Sarah Lucas  
 Victor Man 
 Jean-Luc Mylayne (since 1997)
 Jill Mulleady
 Shirin Neshat
 Ugo Rondinone
 Elizabeth Peyton
 Rebecca Quaytman
 Rachel Rose (since 2020)
 Amy Sillman 
 Frances Stark (since 2020)
 Rirkrit Tiravanija (since 2020)
 Rosemarie Trockel
 Andro Wekua
 Michael Williams (since 2015)
 Anicka Yi

In addition to living artists, Gladstone Gallery also handles the estates of the following: 
 Robert Bechtle
 Keith Haring (since 2010) 
 Huang Yong Ping
 Jannis Kounellis (since 2020)
 Robert Mapplethorpe (since 2017)
 Marisa Merz
 Elizabeth Murray (since 2020)
 Robert Rauschenberg (since 2023)
 Jack Smith (since)

Gladstone Gallery has in the past represented the following:
 Ahmed Alsoudani (until 2017)
 Lari Pittman (until 2019)
 Richard Prince (1987-2008)

Film production

Stuart Regen Visionaries Fund
In 2008, Gladstone initiated the formation of the Stuart Regen Visionaries Fund at the New Museum, established in honor of her late son and art dealer Stuart Regen. The gift is meant to support a series of public lectures and presentations by cultural visionaries and debuted in 2009 with choreographer Bill T. Jones. It has featured prominent international thinkers in the fields of art, architecture, design and contemporary culture. Past speakers have included Jimmy Wales (2010), Alice Waters (2011), Maya Lin (2013), Hilton Als (2015) and Fran Lebowitz (2016, in conversation with Martin Scorsese).

Personal life
Gladstone was married to the late Elliot B. Regen. She has two sons, David and Richard Regen; her third son, Stuart Regen, died in 1998 at USC Norris Comprehensive Cancer Center of non-Hodgkin's lymphoma.
Gladstone has a younger sister, Joan Steinberg.

From 2005 until 2012, Gladstone maintained a residence at 165 Charles Street, a residential tower designed by Richard Meier. She has since moved to a townhouse in Chelsea.

References

External links
Gladstone Gallery official site  

Living people
American art dealers
Women art dealers
American film producers
Year of birth missing (living people)